Sachsia is a genus of West Indian and Floridian plants in the elecampane tribe within the sunflower family.

The genus is named in honour of German botanist Julius von Sachs (1832–1897), who was a German botanist, Plant physiologist and botanical illustrator who taught at the Charles University, Prague.

Species
Includes 3 Accepted Species;
 Sachsia coronopifolia  – Cuba
 Sachsia polycephala  – Bahamas, Cuba, Hispaniola, Jamaica, Florida
 Sachsia tricephala  - Cuba

References

Inuleae
Asteraceae genera
Flora of Florida
Flora of the Caribbean